Governor McLane may refer to:

John McLane (1852–1911), 50th Governor of New Hampshire
Robert Milligan McLane (1815–1898), 39th Governor of Maryland